Tyler Bunch, also known as H.D. Quinn, is an American puppeteer, puppet designer, director, and voice actor.

Career 
In addition to his work for the Jim Henson Company, Bunch has created and performed puppets for PBS, Nickelodeon and Disney's The Muppets Studio. He has acted in a few Off Broadway productions and has made appearances on American television shows such as Law & Order: Criminal Intent, Person of Interest and Law & Order: Special Victims Unit and video games such as Grand Theft Auto V, Red Dead Redemption, Grand Theft Auto: San Andreas and Red Dead Revolver. From 2007–2008, Bunch directed the PBS children's television series SeeMore's Playhouse. He was also one of the puppeteers for the musical stage adaptation of Emmet Otter's Jug-Band Christmas.

Credits

Puppeteer 
 Sesame Street (PBS): Rico, Mr. Can You Guess, Prince Cha-Cha-Charming, Joe Doe, Dancing Monsters (assistant), Tom Twinkletoes, Ryan, "Pre-School Musical" announcer, The Big Bad Wolf (Episode 4145), Jack the Boss, Max Bear, Minnesota Mel, Super Chicken (in Episode 4176), Jeff Bawksworthy, Jeff Probst Muppet, Herry Monster (2013, live stage appearance) various Anything Muppets, Ricardo, Louie, background characters
 Sesame Beginnings (Sony Wonder): Baby Cookie Monster
 Happy, Healthy, Ready for School: Ready Eddie
 Love the Earth! (Genius Entertainment): Park Ranger Squirrel
 Count on Sports (Genius Entertainment): Mr. Referee
 The Get Healthy Now Show: The Big Tomato
 Talk, Listen, Connect: Changes: Ricardo
 Kids' Favorite Country Songs (Genius Entertainment): Froggy
 Learning is Everywhere: Louie
 Bedtime with Elmo (Genius Entertainment): Louie
 Abby in Wonderland (Genius Entertainment): Bottle
 Don't Forget to Watch the Movie (Loews): background characters
 The Best of Elmo (Random House Home Video): background characters
 It's a Big Big World (PBS): Winslow, Riona
 Elmo's World (PBS): Additional Muppet Characters
 Between the Lions (PBS): Walter Pigeon (Season 1 only), Heath the Thesaurus (Season 1 only), Dr. Nitwhite
 Bear in the Big Blue House (Playhouse Disney): Treelo, Pop, Doc Hogg, Rocko, WCHA-CHA Announcer
 The Book of Pooh (Playhouse Disney): Tigger
 The Electric Company (PBS): Special Agent Jack Bowser, Narrator for "The Adventures of the Electric Company on Prankster Planet"
 Muppets from Space (Jim Henson Pictures): Additional Muppet Performer
 Blue's Room (Nick Jr.): Dress-Up Chest
 Oobi (Noggin): Grampu
 The Muppets (Disney): Foozie, Thog, Additional Muppet Performer
 The Muppets (ABC): Additional Muppet Performer
 Late Night Buffet with Augie and Del: Bongo
 1-800-BAR-NONE Commercial (2001): Pets.com Sock Puppet
 The Muppets' Wizard of Oz: Janice, Old Tom, Treelo and Pop
 Puppet Up! Uncensored (Jim Henson Company): performer
 The Producers: puppeteer (pigeons)
 Sheira & Loli's Dittydoodle Works (PBS): director, Zippy, Zimbot
 SeeMore's Playhouse (PBS): director
 The Weepies Can't Go Back Now music video: puppet Steve Tannen
 Late Night Liars (GSN): Sir Sebastian Simian
 Air New Zealand Rico commercials: Rico
 Julie's Greenroom (Netflix): Hugo the Duck
 The Muppets Take the O2 – Additional Muppet Performer (live show at the O2 Arena, Jul. 13–14, 2018)
 Bob the Builder – Additional voices (US Dub)

 Animation roles 
 44 Cats – LaPalette, Amborgio, Jungle, Bongo (as H.D. Quinn)
 Alisa Knows What to Do! – General Draxpod, Showman (as H.D. Quinn)
 Boy Girl Dog Cat Mouse Cheese – Stevie Smith, Dad, Uncle Bub, Ripped Ab Man, Janitor, Robots (as H.D. Quinn)
 Fantastic Journey to Oz – Bear, Wooden General (as H.D. Quinn)
 Kikoriki – Pin, Docko (as H.D. Quinn)
 Nella the Princess Knight (Nickelodeon): Knight Brigade Captain (as H.D. Quinn)
 Nature Cat – Twig Stickman! (as H.D. Quinn)
 Regal Academy – Grandpa Beast (as H.D. Quinn)
 Sheep and Wolves – Belgur and Bucho
 Space Chickens in Space – Glargg
 Super 4 – Wizard Fourchesac (as H.D. Quinn)
 Team Umizoomi (Nickelodeon) – Microraptor and Shape Bandit
 Wallykazam! (Nickelodeon) – Hortis
 WordWorld – Mr. Narrator, Dog, Fly, Duck and Ant (as H.D. Quinn)
 Yoko – Yoko (as H.D. Quinn)
 Yoko and His Friends – Yoko (as H.D. Quinn)

 Anime roles 
 Lu over the Wall – Homeroom Teacher (as H.D. Quinn)
 Your Name – Teshigawara's father (as H.D. Quinn)
 Pokémon the Series: Sun & Moon – Viren, Professor Kukui's Incineroar, Mudsdale, additional roles (as H.D. Quinn)
 Pokémon the Series: XYZ – Lysandre, Ash's Hawlucha, additional roles (as H.D. Quinn)
 Yu-Gi-Oh! VRAINS – Kiyoshi Kogami, Dr. Genome (as H.D. Quinn)

 Video game roles 
 Bear in the Big Blue House: Bear's Sense of Adventure: Pop, Treelo
 Bear in the Big Blue House: Bear's Imagine That!: Pop, Treelo
 Brothers in Arms 3: Sons of War: Dean Miller (as H.D. Quinn)
 Dragon Mania Legends: Dragon Voices
 Dungeon Hunter 4: Male Peasant, Demon Wolf, Additional Voices (as H.D. Quinn)
 Grand Theft Auto V: The Local Population
 Grand Theft Auto: San Andreas: Pedestrian
 Pathfinder: Kingmaker: Ekundayo (as H.D. Quinn)
 Red Dead Redemption: The Local Population
 Red Dead Revolver: Cornet Brother #2, Cowboy #3, Guard
 Super Smash Bros. Ultimate: Incineroar (English) (as H.D. Quinn)
 Thor: The Dark World – The Official Game: Ymir, Marauder Captain

 Live-action roles 
 Law & Order: Criminal Intent (NBC) (Season 2 Episode E3208: Malignant): Drew Romney
 Law and Order: Special Victims Unit (NBC): (Season 14 Episode E319: Her Negotiations): Bert Swanson
 The Tick (Amazon Video) (5 episodes): Stosh
 Jack's Big Music Show'' (Noggin) (1 episode): The Giant

References

External links 

SeeMore's Playhouse official website

Living people
American directors
American male actors
American puppeteers
Muppet performers
Sesame Street Muppeteers
1970 births